The 2019 Mzansi Super League, also known as the MSL 2.0, was the second edition of the Mzansi Super League (MSL) Twenty20 (T20) franchise cricket tournament in South Africa. It started on 8 November and ended on 16 December 2019. Jozi Stars were the defending champions, having won the inaugural 2018 tournament.

Squads
On 7 August 2019, Cricket South Africa announced that more than 250 cricketers had registered for the tournament's draft. Each of the six franchise teams also named the players they had retained for this years' edition. The following day the marquee players were announced. The full squads were confirmed on 3 September 2019.

Before the start of the tournament, David Willey was ruled out due to injury and was replaced by Isuru Udana as the marquee player for Paarl Rocks.

1 The Jozi Stars have signed Shoaib Malik to take over from Chris Gayle who will exit the stars post their sixth game.

Aiden Markram injured himself before the start of the tournament as was replaced by Kyle Verreynne in the Paarl Rocks squad.

Robert Frylinck withdrew from the competition after being selected to play in the 2019 T10 League in Abu Dhabi. He was replaced by Wesley Marshall.

Points table

  The team topping the table after the league phase progresses to the final.
  The second and third teams play against each other in the Play-off match.
 The winning team gets a bonus point for a run rate better than 1.25 times that of the losing side.

League stage
The MSL released the full fixture list on 27 September 2019. The team that tops the table gets direct passage to the final and will also have home ground advantage.

Playoffs

Eliminator

Final

Statistics

Most runs

Most wickets

Broadcasting
The SABC again got the domestic broadcast rights for the 2019 season. All matches were covered live on the SABC3 television channel and on Radio 2000.

Global Sports Commerce of Singapore bought the broadcast and digital rights outside of South Africa.

References

External links

Series home at ESPNCricinfo

Mzansi Super League
Mzansi Super League